Midland Highway may refer to:

Australia
Midland Highway (Tasmania)
Midland Highway (Victoria)

United States
Midland Highway No. 420, a highway in Oregon
Midland Trail, a former national auto trail spanning the United States